La Colonia is a district of the Pococí canton, in the Limón province of Costa Rica.

History 
La Colonia was created on 11 June 2012 by Decreto Ejecutivo N° 24-2012-MGP.

Geography 
La Colonia has an area of  km² and an elevation of  metres.

It presents a flat landscape in the totality of its territory, with an average altitude of 5 meters on the level of the sea.

It is located in the central Caribbean region and borders the districts of Jiménez to the east and Guápiles to the south, to the west and to the north.

Its head, the village of San Rafael, is located 6 km (12 minutes) to the northwest of Guápiles and 68.7 km (1 hours 33 minutes) to the northeast of San José the capital of the nation.

Demographics 

For the 2011 census, La Colonia had not been created, therefore census data will be available until 2021.

Settlements
The population centers that make up the district are:
Villages (Poblados): San Rafael, Brisas del Toro Amarillo, Cascada, La Victoria, Losilla, San Bosco, Santa Elena, Prado (Parte)

Transportation

Road transportation 
The district is covered by the following road routes:
 National Route 247
 National Route 249
 National Route 809

References

External links

Instituto Nacional de Estadísticas y Censos
Municipalidad de Pococí

Districts of Limón Province
Populated places in Limón Province